Kentucky Route 550 (KY 550) is a  
state highway in eastern Kentucky that runs from Kentucky Routes 15 and 80 in northwestern Hazard to Kentucky Route 80 and Judge Road in Eastern via Darfork, Dwarf, Fisty, Carrie, Hindman, Garner, Mousie, Lackey, Garrett, and Eastern.

Route description 
The route begins at an interchange-type junction of KY 80 and KY 15 at Hazard. It runs concurrently with KY 476 for most of its course through eastern Perry County. At Dwarf, KY 550 separates and moves into Knott County. It then goes to the county seat of Hindman, where it meets KY 160. It then has a runs concurrently with KY 7 after it enters Floyd County. It crosses KY 80 for the second time while concurrent with KY 7. KY 550 continues into southern Floyd County until reaching its eastern terminus at a third intersection with KY 80 at the town of Eastern.

History 
Most of KY 550 is an original, old alignment of KY 80. KY 550 was first designated along this roadway when KY 80 was rerouted to a four-lane divided highway in the late 1970s.

Major intersections

References

External links
KY 80 at KentuckyRoads.com

Kentucky Route 80
0550
0550
0550
0550